The 1987–88 DFB-Pokal was the 45th season of the annual German football cup competition. It began on 28 August 1987 and ended on 28 May 1988. Eintracht Frankfurt defeated VfL Bochum 1–0 thereby winning the trophy for the fourth time.

Matches

First round

Replays

Second round

Replays

Round of 16

Replays

Quarter-finals

Semi-finals

Final

References

External links
  fussballdaten.de

1987-88
1987–88 in German football cups